(born April 1, 1967) is a Japanese video game designer best known for creating the Dead or Alive series and also reviving the Ninja Gaiden franchise in 2004. Joining Tecmo in 1992, Itagaki produced two video game franchises that were commercial successes and earned him several promotions; he headed Tecmo's development team, Team Ninja, and sat on the executive board. He left the company after 16 years of service, filing a lawsuit against it for withholding bonus pay. He formed a new company Valhalla Game Studios with several Team Ninja members and released Devil's Third. The company dissolved in December 2021 and he has now formed a new one called Apex Games.

Personal life
Born and raised in Tokyo, Tomonobu Itagaki graduated from Waseda University Senior High School in March 1985. He enrolled in Waseda University and graduated from its School of Law in 1992.

Itagaki is married and has a daughter, whom he has mentioned as one of the primary influences on his projects, including developing Ninja Gaiden: Dragon Sword for the Nintendo DS, and a constant gaming partner in games like the Halo series. Itagaki has in his office a set of katana Japanese swords his father made for him, which he tends to take out to show to his visitors. As he wishes to stop people from reading his expressions during gambling-type games, he is always seen wearing sunglasses, a habit that has become his trademark in the video game community.

Career
Itagaki joined Tecmo in 1992 as a graphics programmer, and initially worked on the Super Famicom version of the American football video game, Super Tecmo Bowl. His career breakthrough came in 1996 with his first Dead or Alive game, a game based on Sega Model 2 hardware (Virtua Fighter) created in response to Tecmo management's request. He was mentored by Yoshiaki Inose (of Solomon's Key, Bomb Jack, Rygar and original Ninja Gaiden fame) and Akihiko Shimoji (Tecmo Bowl) in his early years at Tecmo, and was impressed by them to include fun as a necessary component in his projects.

His rise through the company had been steady since then. He was appointed as the head of the third creative department in April 2001. He then assumed the post of Team Ninja Leader in July 2001. Tecmo appointed him as an Executive Officer in June 2004. He later assumed the position of General Manager of the high-end production department in February, 2006. His Executive Officer position was however taken away in August the same year, due to him being accused of sexual harassment. He was later judged innocent by a Tokyo district court in June 2007.

The release of Dead or Alive 2 had greatly increased the series popularity, as well as Itagaki's. He had sought to create fighting games with details he felt were lacking in other games. In the later iterations, Itagaki has built the story of the games around themes of family - Kasumi and Ayane in Dead or Alive 3, and Helena in Dead or Alive 4. To date, the series has gone through four iterations with various enhanced editions. A fifth iteration, Dead or Alive 5, was made in his absence and released in September 2012. Dead or Alive 5 received two additional releases of the base title; Dead or Alive 5 Ultimate, which released in September 2013, a year after the original release. The second and final iteration of the game was titled Dead or Alive 5 Last Round and released in February 2015. Given the success of Dead or Alive 5, Team Ninja created a sequel, also without Itagaki's inclusion, and Dead or Alive 6 released in March 2019 and is currently the latest release in the franchise.

In the Dead or Alive Xtreme Beach Volleyball series, Itagaki brought together the girls of Dead or Alive onto an island. The player is to foster good relationship between the girls to create a harmonious winning beach volleyball duo. In the second iteration of the series, the focus is shifted by expanding the number of activities the player can have the girls take part in. He explains the core of the game as a paradise where the player can watch the girls they 'love' enjoy simple activities.

Ninja Gaiden was Itagaki's effort to develop a game centered on violent gameplay, with super ninja Ryu Hayabusa as the protagonist. Capitalizing on the brand name of the earlier NES series, Itagaki developed a critically acclaimed action-adventure game for the Xbox which also had an international online tournament held for it. He continued work on it to release Ninja Gaiden Black as the opus of his Ninja Gaiden work. He continued the series on the Nintendo DS with Ninja Gaiden: Dragon Sword, partly due to a promise made to his daughter. At the same time, he brought the series' next chapter onto the Xbox 360 as Ninja Gaiden II.

Itagaki claims to be one of the very few in the Japanese video game industry to establish communications with the Western world. He suggests other Japanese developers should do like-wise and be aware of the gaming tastes outside Japan, so as to be able to reverse the Japanese gaming industry slump of 2005.

On June 2, 2008, just before the release of Ninja Gaiden II for the Xbox 360, Itagaki announced that he was resigning from Tecmo and was suing the company for withholding a bonus promised for his previous works. He was also suing Tecmo's president Yoshimi Yasuda for damages based on "unreasonable and disingenuous statements" made in front of Itagaki's colleagues. In an interview with 1up.com, Itagaki has revealed that he is working on a project with former members of Team Ninja under a new studio, Valhalla Game Studios. The title in question, Devil's Third, was revealed shortly before E3 2010.

In January 2021, Itagaki announced that he has established a new game studio, Itagaki Games (later renamed Apex Games), and stated that he would be interested in working with Microsoft again. He announced in July 2022 that his company is working on a new NFT game called Warrior.

Works

Design approach

Game design philosophy
Itagaki believes a good game should be an integrated product of good graphics, interactivity, and playability. He also places a high priority on ensuring his games are interactive with the player's actions and respond quickly to the player's inputs. It is this opinion which led to his derogatory statements on Heavenly Sword. He finds the payoff for the game's button-prompting sequences to be less fulfilling than that of Genji: Dawn of the Samurai's (whose Kamui sequences he calls dumb, but entertaining). Likewise, he cited Metal Gear Solid 2: Sons of Liberty and Final Fantasy X as games lacking the interactivity appealing to him.

Itagaki professes a liking for simplicity of inputs, he states too many inputs would result in the loss of the gaming experience. As such, he respects Sega-AM2 for their work on Virtua Fighter 4 But he stated that DOA 3 is still a better game.. Likewise, he deplores implementing scenarios to show off technology just for the sake of it, sarcastically asking what is the point of cutting down "thousand heads of cabbages on screen." In his integration mindset, everything (graphics, controllers, interactiveness, responsiveness, etc.) has its place, even CG pre-rendered cutscenes which he says can deliver a better cinematic experience of some scenes than doing them in real-time.

Opinions on hardware
As a game developer, Itagaki has defined his philosophy as being able to extract the strengths of a game machine, and integrate them together to develop games to a level no one else can reach. He defines a game developer's satisfaction with a game machine as dependent upon these criteria. With this philosophy, he continually expresses happiness in developing on the Xbox 360, proclaiming it to be more 'software friendly' than the PlayStation 3. Furthermore, he admires the Nintendo Wii's dedication to innovation, which he holds in high regard for the spirit of gaming.  Itagaki claimed that he wanted to develop his games for the Xbox 360. He viewed the Xbox 360 as the most powerful console on the market at the time of its design.

Itagaki has also spoken of his handheld philosophy which goes for responsiveness and physical interaction, instead of raw hardware power. As such, Itagaki refuses to make a handheld game for the PlayStation Portable (PSP), stating it goes against the design philosophy of being a handheld device. He says a game created, based on the specifications of the PSP, would be more suited for a true home console. This view is reflected in his statements on why Ninja Gaiden: Dragon Sword as a handheld game has to be designed to take advantage of the Nintendo DS' touchpad rather than conventional inputs which would have rendered it a typical game.

Pet projects
Itagaki classifies his projects into core projects (for business and technical excellence purposes), and those purely for self-fulfillment. The Dead or Alive Xtreme Beach Volleyball series and Dead or Alive: Code Chronos fall into the latter. The Dead or Alive Xtreme Beach Volleyball games are just meant for simple fun, and to fulfill a 'love' for the female characters, letting the player nurture and watch the girls partaking in simple joys. Even though he admits to there being sexual content in the game, Itagaki refuses to create scenarios which he feels are vulgar for his 'daughters', a term he uses to call the female characters. Code Chronos falls into the same category of development, developed as Itagaki's hobby for style.

Work ethics
Itagaki is thorough with his games, working on them from start to release, and even post release to correct what he feels are deficiencies, and polish them up to their full potential. He has shown this in his project developments, such as pushing back the release of Dead or Alive 4 just to polish the game based on feedback of top Japanese Dead or Alive players recruited to test it out. For Ninja Gaiden, he wanted to leave the best and the ultimate action game on the Xbox before moving on to the Xbox 360, thus he reworked the game and integrated the additional downloadable content to produce Ninja Gaiden Black. With Dead or Alive Xtreme 2, he chose to patch an easy-cash exploit rather than leaving it alone and ruminating over the consequences.

Itagaki creates his game characters by immersing himself in their roles and the games. This is a reason why he objects to the suggestion of Kasumi in the Ninja Gaiden universe, saying her 'soft' nature is conflicting with the 'hard-edged' nature of the game whereas Ayane perfectly fits in. It is this role immersion which helps him to develop and exclude guns from the moveset of the Spartan named Nicole in Dead or Alive 4. However, immersing himself in the games' atmosphere has also failed him at times. The Butt Battle, and Tug-of-War of Dead or Alive Xtreme 2 were heavily panned on the basis of minigame design. Itagaki defended those games as nostalgia comedic pieces, meant to make the player remember the celebrity games played on Japanese television.

In 2006, various gaming sites reported that an unnamed female former Tecmo employee had filed a sexual harassment suit against Itagaki. She claimed that Itagaki had made several unwanted sexual advances on her since 2003. While Itagaki admitted to kissing her, he claimed that whatever had gone between them had been consensual. Tecmo's ensuing investigation reached the conclusion that "the allegations in question were a result of the former employee's desire to vent frustration over her own personal affair, and not indicative of sexual harassment." Tecmo has also demoted Itagaki and the accuser for their mingling of "personal affairs with their corporate responsibilities". Meanwhile, the court has found Itagaki innocent of the charges.

Frank personality
Itagaki values frank and "to the point" attitudes, believing anything else would allow "quibbles and sectionalists" to come in and derail the train of thought. His frank attitude is also in line with his admitted aggression, taking criticisms as challenges to overcome instead of something to mope over. This relates to his desire for challenges, producing games like Ninja Gaiden which are acknowledged as 'hard' by the gaming industry, and to push himself to produce games which can contend as the best games of the genre. He openly claims to be the sole creative force behind his projects, as well as being able to convey his plan clearly for the team to understand. He bemoans that the Japanese are starting to forget the basic concepts, closing off their minds to outside criticisms.

Itagaki has consistently given harsh opinions on Namco's Tekken games, mainly due to his grudge against the company for its insulting radio commercial on his Dead or Alive game. He has stated he never forgets an insult to his family, and will retaliate with "nuclear missiles more than 100 times for that". This along with what he views as Tekken's stagnation in the fighting game genre (starting from Tekken 4), led him to condemn the Tekken series, placing it as his top five hated games, in spite of him stating Tekken, Tekken 2, and Tekken 3 were good games which his family enjoyed.

References

External links

Tomonobu Itagaki's profile at IGN
Tomonobu Itagaki's profile at GiantBomb
Valhalla Game Studios International Ltd.

1967 births
Japanese video game designers
Living people
People from Tokyo
Waseda University alumni